Jacqueline Evans (1914–1989) was a British-born Mexican film actress. Evans was born on the 17th of January 1914 in Islington, London. She made her first film appearance in the 1946 film Walking on Air in a minor role. Her first larger role came two years later when she played the part of Cassandra in the 1948 film Adventures of Casanova starring Arturo de Córdova. In 1950 Evans got her first leading role in the comedy/fantasy film Simbad el mareado. Evans is best known for playing the part of Rebecca Boone in the 1956 western Daniel Boone, Trail Blazer which starred Bruce Bennett. Evans last appearance was in the murder mystery Murder in Three Acts which was based on the book by Agatha Christie, Three Act Tragedy and saw Peter Ustinov take on the role of Hercule Poirot. On the 22nd of June 1989, Evans died aged 75.

Filmography

References

Bibliography 
 Daryl E. Murphy. Carrera Panamericana: History of the Mexican Road Race, 1950-54. iUniverse, 2008.

External links 
 

1914 births
1989 deaths
British film actresses
Mexican film actresses
British emigrants to Mexico
People from Islington (district)
Actresses from London

Carrera Panamericana drivers